Cannoncourt Farm Pit is a  geological Site of Special Scientific Interest in Maidenhead in Berkshire. It is a Geological Conservation Review site.

In the early twentieth century, these gravel pits yielded many Paleolithic tools of the Acheulian and Levallois industries, associated with the Neanderthals, including the largest hand axe ever found. The site is in the Lynch Hill Terrace of the River Thames, dating to the Wolstonian Stage between 350-200,000 years ago.

The pits have long ago been filled in and are now under a path and open ground in northern Maidenhead.

References

Sites of Special Scientific Interest in Berkshire
Geological Conservation Review sites